In baseball, a home run is credited to a batter when he hits a fair ball and reaches home safely on the same play, without the benefit of an error.  Fifty-nine different players have hit two home runs in an inning of a Major League Baseball (MLB) game to date, the most recent being Gleyber Torres of the New York Yankees on September 21, 2022.  Regarded as a notable achievement, five players have accomplished the feat more than once in their career; no player has ever hit more than two home runs in an inning.  Charley Jones was the first player to hit two home runs in one inning, doing so for the Boston Red Stockings against the Buffalo Bisons on June 10, 1880.

These innings have resulted in other single-inning and single-game MLB records being set due to the prodigious offensive performance.  Bobby Lowe and Mike Cameron finished their respective games with a total of four home runs, equaling the record for most home runs in one game.  Both of the home runs hit by Fernando Tatís in the third inning for the St. Louis Cardinals on April 23, 1999, were grand slams.  Not only did he tie the record for most grand slams in one game, Tatís became the only player to hit two grand slams in the same inning and established a new major league record with eight runs batted in (RBI) in a single inning.  A decade later, Alex Rodriguez set the single-inning American League record for RBIs with seven when he hit a three-run home run and a grand slam in the sixth inning for the New York Yankees on October 4, 2009.

Bret Boone and Cameron are the only players to each hit two home runs in one inning on the same day (May 2, 2002), in the same game, in the same inning (the first), in a pair of back-to-back at bats, and as teammates (playing for the Seattle Mariners).  Carlos Baerga, Mark Bellhorn, and Kendrys Morales hit their home runs from both sides of the plate.  Jeff King is the sole player to accomplish the feat in consecutive seasons.  Bill Regan has the fewest career home runs among players who have two home runs in one inning with 18, while Alex Rodriguez, with 696, hit more home runs than any other player in this group and amassed the fifth most in major league history.  Willie McCovey, Mark McGwire, David Ortiz, Rodriguez, Gary Sheffield, and Sammy Sosa are also members of the 500 home run club.

Of the 44 players eligible for the Baseball Hall of Fame who have hit two home runs in an inning, seven have been elected, three on the first ballot.  Players are eligible for the Hall of Fame if they have played in at least 10 MLB seasons, and have either been retired for five seasons or deceased for at least six months.  These requirements leave three players ineligible who are active, seven players ineligible who are living and have played in the past five seasons, and six players ineligible who did not play in 10 seasons.

Players

References
General

Specific

Major League Baseball records
Major League Baseball statistics